Jamal Seeto  is a Papua New Guinean footballer who plays as a forward.

References 

Living people
1990 births
Papua New Guinean footballers
Papua New Guinea international footballers
Association football forwards
2012 OFC Nations Cup players